Doll's House is a Bangladeshi television soap opera written by Abul Kalam Azad, Chonchol and Tazin Ahmed. The serial ran on ATN Bangla from 2007 to 2009, with 380 episodes in all. It is set in modern-day Dhaka. It stars Suborna Mustafa, Shompa Reza, Mita Chowdhury, Wahida Mollick Jolly, Chitralekha Guha, Traupa Majumder, Jeetu Ahsan,  Intekhab Dinar, Bonna Mirza, Farhana Mithu, Bijori Barkatullah, Fazlur Rahman Babu, Shanjida Priti, Shojol, Humayun Faridi, Tushar Khan and the co-writer himself, Abul Kalam Azad.

Characters
 Suborna Mustafa
 Shampa Reza
 Mita Chowdhury
 Wahida Mollick Jolly
 Chitralekha Guha
 Tropa Majumder
Jeetu Ahsan
 Intekhab Dinar
 Bonna Mirza
 Farhana Mithu
 Bijori Barkatullah
 Fazlur Rahman Babu
 Sanjida Preeti
 Shajal
 Humayun Faridi
 Tushar Khan
 Abul Kalam Azad
 Subhashis Bhowmik

See also
Songsoptok
Bohubrihi
Kothao Keu Nei
Baker bhai
Aaj Robibar
Vober Hat
House Full (TV series)
Bishaash

Further reading
 
 

2000s Bangladeshi television series
2007 Bangladeshi television series debuts
2009 Bangladeshi television series endings
Bangladeshi drama television series
Bengali-language television programming in Bangladesh
ATN Bangla original programming